The Gauss–Legendre algorithm is an algorithm to compute the digits of . It is notable for being rapidly convergent, with only 25 iterations producing 45 million correct digits of . However, it has some drawbacks (for example, it is computer memory-intensive) and therefore all record-breaking calculations for many years have used other methods, almost always the Chudnovsky algorithm.

The method is based on the individual work of Carl Friedrich Gauss (1777–1855) and Adrien-Marie Legendre (1752–1833) combined with modern algorithms for multiplication and square roots. It repeatedly replaces two numbers by their arithmetic and geometric mean, in order to approximate their arithmetic-geometric mean.

The version presented below is also known as the Gauss–Euler, Brent–Salamin (or Salamin–Brent) algorithm; it was independently discovered in 1975 by Richard Brent and Eugene Salamin.

Algorithm 
 Initial value setting: 
  is then approximated as: 

The first three iterations give (approximations given up to and including the first incorrect digit):

The algorithm has quadratic convergence, which essentially means that the number of correct digits doubles with each iteration of the algorithm.

Mathematical background

Limits of the arithmetic–geometric mean 

The arithmetic–geometric mean of two numbers, a0 and b0, is found by calculating the limit of the sequences

which both converge to the same limit.
If  and  then the limit is  where  is the complete elliptic integral of the first kind

where  is the complete elliptic integral of the second kind:

 and 

Gauss knew of both of these results.

Legendre’s identity 
Legendre proved the following identity:

Elementary proof with integral calculus 

The Gauss-Legendre algorithm can be proven to give results converging to π using only integral calculus. This is done here and here.

See also 
 Numerical approximations of

References 

Pi algorithms